Before 2008, San Diego County historically had been a Republican stronghold. The Republican presidential nominee carried the county in every presidential election from 1948 through 2004, except in 1992 when Bill Clinton won a plurality. In 2008, Barack Obama became the first Democratic presidential candidate to win a majority of votes in San Diego County since World War II; he won a majority of county votes again in 2012. In 2016, Hillary Clinton won the county by almost 20%, the largest margin for a Democratic presidential candidate since 1936. In 2020, Joseph R Biden, Jr. won by an even larger 22.7% margin.

The city of San Diego itself is more Democratic than the county's average and has voted for Democrats Clinton, Gore, Kerry, Obama twice, Clinton, and Biden respectively, in the last eight presidential elections. With a few exceptions, areas close to the Mexican border tend to be more Democratic, while North County tends to be more Republican. In the 2004 presidential election, San Diego, Encinitas, National City, Del Mar, and some other areas voted for John Kerry; San Marcos, Escondido, Carlsbad, Oceanside, Coronado, Santee, Poway, El Cajon, and Vista overwhelmingly backed George W. Bush. Chula Vista, La Mesa, Lemon Grove, Solana Beach, and Imperial Beach are considered swing areas of the county – Chula Vista and Imperial Beach narrowly backed Al Gore in 2000 but narrowly voted for Bush in 2004, while Solana Beach switched from Bush in 2000 to Kerry in 2004. La Mesa narrowly voted for Bush both times, and Lemon Grove narrowly went Democratic both times.  However, all of these swing areas, along with Oceanside and Carlsbad voted for Obama in 2008 (Carlsbad voted for Obama by a plurality).

Notably, the city of Coronado supported every Republican presidential candidate from 1964 to 2016, and likely earlier given the voting patterns of the county in that era. However, in 2020, the city of Coronado broke its decades-long Republican voting streak by selecting the Democratic candidate, Joe Biden.

Election Central
San Diego County uses Golden Hall, a convention facility next to San Diego's City Hall, as "Election Central."  The County Registrar of Voters rents the hall to distribute election results. Supporters and political observers gather to watch the results come in; supporters of the various candidates parade around the hall, carrying signs and chanting; candidates give their victory and concession speeches and host parties for campaign volunteers and donors at the site; and television stations broadcast live from the floor of the convention center. The atmosphere at Election Central on the evening of election day has been compared to the voting portion of a political party national convention.

Federal and state representation

In the United States House of Representatives, San Diego County is split between five congressional districts:
 
 
 
  and
 .

In the California State Assembly, San Diego County is split between seven legislative districts:
 ,
 ,
 ,
 ,
 ,
 , and
 .

In the California State Senate, San Diego County is split between four legislative districts:
 ,
 ,
 , and
 .

Voter registration

According to the San Diego County Registrar of Voters, as of April 2018, there are 1,671,555 registered voters in San Diego County. Of those, 611,831 (36.6%) are registered Democratic, 491,783 (29.4%) are registered Republican, 476,186 (28.4%) declined to state a political party, 56,167 (3.4%) are registered American Independence Party, 15,418 (0.9%) are registered Libertarian, 6,989 (0.4%) are registered Green, and 4,869 (0.3%) are registered Peace & Freedom. An additional 8,312 (0.5%) are identified as Miscellaneous, or Other political parties.

Voter registration by city

Gay rights
On Nov 4, 2008 San Diego County voted 53.71% for Proposition 8 which amended the California Constitution to ban same-sex marriages, thus restoring Proposition 22 which was overturned by a ruling from the California Supreme Court.  However the city of San Diego, along with the North County coastal towns of Del Mar, Encinitas, and Solana Beach, voted against Proposition 8. La Mesa was a virtual tie for the proposition, while Carlsbad only supported the proposition by a 2% margin.

Notes

References

 
San Diego County